This is a list of seasons completed by the San Jose State Spartans football team of the National Collegiate Athletic Association (NCAA) Division I Football Bowl Subdivision (FBS). The team began competition in 1892.

Originally an independent, San Jose State first joined a conference in 1922 when it joined the California Coast Conference. That conference only lasted three years, so the team became independent again in 1925. They joined the Far Western Conference in 1929. San Jose State became independent for the third time in 1935, before becoming a charter member of the California Collegiate Athletic Association in 1939. When the NCAA first started classification in 1937, San Jose State was part of the NCAA College Division (Small College). They became independent for the fourth time in 1950, also moving to the NCAA University Division (Major College) that year. They stayed independent until becoming a charter member of the Pacific Coast Athletic Association (PCAA) in 1969. The conference was renamed the Big West Conference in 1988. San Jose State later moved to the Western Athletic Conference (WAC) in 1996 and Mountain West Conference (MW) in 2013.

Seasons

Notes
 San Jose State forfeited 3 wins and 1 tie, including two PCAA conference wins,  for using an ineligible player. This made San Jose State's adjusted record for 1979 3–8 overall (2–2 PCAA).
 The PCAA adjusted San Jose State's 1984 record to 7–4 overall (6–1 PCAA) after UNLV forfeited all 11 of its wins for 1984.

References
General

Specific

San Jose State

San Jose State Spartans football seasons